The 2013 Caribbean Premier League or for sponsorship reasons, Limacol CPL 2013 was the inaugural season of the Caribbean Premier League, established by the West Indies Cricket Board. The tournament began on 30 July and ended on 24 August 2013.

Format
The tournament has six teams and is divided into a group stage and a knockout stage. The group stage comprises 21 matches, with each team playing 7 matches. The knockout stage features two semi-finals and a final.

Squads

Teams and standings

League progression

Group stage

Fixtures

Knockout stage

Fixtures

Statistics

Most runs

Most wickets

References

External links
Tournament website on ESPN Cricinfo
Tournament results on upcric

Caribbean Premier League
Caribbean Premier League
Caribbean Premier League